Barnes Osei (born 8 January 1995), simply known as Barnes, is a Ghanaian professional footballer who plays for Erovnuli Liga club Dinamo Tbilisi as a right winger.

References

External links

1995 births
Living people
Footballers from Accra
Ghanaian footballers
Ghana under-20 international footballers
Association football forwards
F.C. Paços de Ferreira players
C.F. União players
F.C. Arouca players
Associação Académica de Coimbra – O.A.F. players
Nea Salamis Famagusta FC players
FC Dinamo Tbilisi players
Primeira Liga players
Liga Portugal 2 players
Cypriot First Division players
Erovnuli Liga players
Ghanaian expatriate footballers
Expatriate footballers in Portugal
Ghanaian expatriate sportspeople in Portugal
Expatriate footballers in Cyprus
Ghanaian expatriate sportspeople in Cyprus
Expatriate footballers in Georgia (country)
Ghanaian expatriate sportspeople in Georgia (country)